Philip J. Rahoi (April 5, 1896 – March 11, 1980) was an American politician who served as a member of both chambers of the Michigan Legislature and as the mayor of Iron Mountain, Michigan;

Background 
Born in Iron Mountain, Michigan, Rahoi served in the Michigan House of Representatives in 1935. He then served in the Michigan State Senate from 1955 until 1966. He also served as mayor of Iron Mountain, Michigan. Rahoi was a Democrat. He died in Kingsford, Michigan.

References

1896 births
1980 deaths
People from Iron Mountain, Michigan
Mayors of places in Michigan
Democratic Party members of the Michigan House of Representatives
Democratic Party Michigan state senators
20th-century American politicians
People from Kingsford, Michigan